is an immunologist and a Distinguished Professor of Osaka University. He is best known for the discovery of regulatory T cells and to describe their role in the immune system. This discovery is used in the treatment of cancer and autoimmune diseases.

Biography 
Sakaguchi was born in Japan's Shiga Prefecture and educated at Kyoto University.

In 2015, the news agency Thomson Reuters signals Shimon Sakaguchi among potential recipients of the Nobel Prize in Physiology or Medicine.

Awards and recognition

 2004: William B. Coley Award
 2008: Keio Medical Science Prize
 2009: Medals of Honor (Japan), purple ribbon
 2011: Asahi Prize
 2012: Foreign associate of the National Academy of Sciences
 2015: Gairdner Foundation International Award.
 2017: Crafoord Prize
 2017: Person of Cultural Merit
 2017: Momofuku Ando Prize
 2019: Order of Culture
 2020: Paul Ehrlich and Ludwig Darmstaedter Prize
 2020: Robert Koch Prize

References

External links 

 
 Osaka University Immunology Frontier Research Center.

1951 births
Living people
Japanese immunologists
Kyoto University alumni
Foreign associates of the National Academy of Sciences
Academic staff of Osaka University
Recipients of the Order of Culture